The Sukhoi Su-38 (-38) is a Russian agricultural aircraft, the first aircraft of this type to be designed and built by the Sukhoi Design Bureau civil aircraft section (Sukhoi Civil Aircraft (CJSC)).

Design and development
Design originally began in 1993 as a development of the Sukhoi Su-29 aerobatic aircraft. Development was suspended due to economic problems, and when restarted in 1998, the aircraft was redesigned, reducing the aircraft's size and replacing the originally planned M-14 radial engine with a LOM Praha 337S inline engine. The first prototype made its maiden flight on 27 July 2001, with a second flying by June 2002. As no users have yet expressed interest in the aircraft, the project is currently proceeding at a low pace.

Specifications (Su-38L)

See also

References

Karnozov, Vladimir and Stewart Penny. "Su-38 Sukhoi readies Su-38 for first flight". Flight International, 3–9 July 2001, p. 24.

Further reading
 with

External links

 Sukhoi design bureau page mentioning design of the Su-38L
 list of the current projects of the Sukhoi design bureau
 Sukhoi civil programmes list
 Image at official Sukhoi website

Soviet and Russian agricultural aircraft
2000s Russian civil utility aircraft
Su-038
Single-engined tractor aircraft
Aircraft first flown in 2001
Low-wing aircraft